Graphonomics is the interdisciplinary field directed towards the scientific analysis of the handwriting process, product, and other graphic skills.,

Researchers in handwriting recognition, forensic handwriting examination, kinesiology, psychology, computer science, artificial intelligence, paleography and neuroscience cooperate in order to achieve a better understanding of the human skill of handwriting.  Research in graphonomics generally involves handwriting movement analysis in one form or another.

History and conferences
The first international conference relating to graphonomics was held in Nijmegen, The Netherlands, in July 1982.  The term 'graphonomics' was used there for the first time.

The second conference was held in July 1985 in Hong Kong and, at that meeting, a decision was taken to form the International Graphonomics Society. The IGS became a legal non-profit organization under Netherlands law on January 30, 1987.

Subsequently, an international conference, symposium and/or workshop has been held every two years.  Past events have been held in various locations with most events having a specific theme, as follows: 
Nijmegen, The Netherlands (1982), Motor Aspects of Handwriting
Hong Kong (1985), Graphonomics
Montreal, QC, Canada (1987), Third International Symposium on Handwriting and Computer Applications
Trondheim, Norway (1989), Fourth IGS Conference. The Development of Graphic Skills (DOGS)
Tempe, AZ, USA (1991), Fifth Handwriting Conference of the IGS. Motor Control of Handwriting
Paris, France (1993), Sixth International Conference on Handwriting and Drawing (ICOHD93)
London, ON, Canada (1995), Seventh Biennial Conference of the International Graphonomics Society. Basic and Applied Issues in Handwriting and Drawing Research.  Note: this conference was held jointly with Annual Symposium of the Association of Forensic Document Examiners
Genoa, Italy (1997), Eighth Biennial Conference of the International Graphonomics Society. Motor Control and Neuroscience
Singapore, Singapore (1999), 9th Biennial Conference of the International Graphonomics Society. Written Oriental Languages
Nijmegen, The Netherlands (2001), Tenth Biennial Conference of the International Graphonomics Society. Motor Disorders
Scottsdale, AZ, USA (2003), 11th Conference of the International Graphonomics Society. Connecting Sciences Using Graphonomlc Research
Salerno, Italy (2005), 12th Biennial Conference of the International Graphonomics Society. Advances in Graphonomics: Perceiving, Deciding, Acting
Melbourne, Australia (2007), 13th Conference of the International Graphonomics Society
Dijon, France (2009), 14th Biennial Conference of the International Graphonomics Society. Advances in Graphonomics
 Live Aqua Cancun, Mexico (2011), The 15th International Graphonomics Society Conference. Translational Graphonomics
 Naraa, Japan (2013), The 16th International Graphonomics Society Conference. Learn from the Past
 Pointe-à-Pitre, Guadeloupe (2015), The 17th International Graphonomics Society Conference. Drawing, Handwriting Processing and Analysis: New Advances and Challenges
 Gaeta, Italy (2017), 18th International Graphonomics Society Conference. Graphonomics for e-citizens: e-health, e-society, e-education.
 Cancun, Mexico (2019), The 19th International Graphonomics Society Conference. Graphonomics and Your Brain on Art, Creativity and Innovation.
 La Palmas De Gran Canaria, Spain (2021), The 20th Conference of the International Graphonomics Society. Intertwining Graphonomics with Human movements.

International Graphonomics Society
As mentioned above, the IGS was created at the 1985 international conference with the main purpose being to coordinate and assist in the growth and development of the field of graphonomics in all its forms.  This has been done through conferences, workshops and publication of proceedings from those events.

IGS Publications
As the main academic body for graphonomics, the IGS publishes a biannual bulletin as well as proceedings of the biennial conference.  The Bulletin of the International Graphonomics Society is published by the IGS in March and November each year and it is the primary means of communication among IGS members and the public.  A complete list of past BIGS issues is available online.  Conference proceedings are published in the form of a peer-reviewed scientific journal or book shortly after each of the conferences.

Research topics
Some research topics in graphonomics include:
Handwriting regeneration - the simulated production of a given recording of handwriting movement. This is realized not using recorded kinematic or kinetic signals but by an abstracted model of human movement control.
Handwriting generation - the process of producing handwriting (e.g. pen tip) movements. This usually implies the use of a computer simulation model which can generate handwriting movement and/or shape, producing newly generated text in a manner similar to the handwriting of an individual person.
Handwriting Production Fluency - Measures of the ability of handwriting in the integral of the absolute of the acceleration signal (velocity peaks), or alternatively the absolute of the integral of the jerk time function.

See also 
 Graphemics
 Writing systems
 Grammatology
 Letterform
Terminology in graphonomics

References

External links
International Graphonomics Society (IGS)

Penmanship
Questioned document examination